The 2019–20 Egyptian Basketball Super League was the 46th season of the Egyptian Basketball Super League. The season started on 10 December 2019. The champions qualify for the 2021 Basketball Africa League (BAL). On 15 March 2020, the season was suspended due to the COVID-19 pandemic. The season resumed 16 August 2020.

Al Ittihad won its 15th title.

Teams
The 2019–20 season existed out of the following 16 teams:

Arenas and locations

Regular season

Top Group

Bottom Group

Playoffs

Bracket

Quarterfinals

|}

Semifinals

|}

Finals

|}

References

Basketball competitions in Egypt
Egypt